Noxen is a census-designated place located in Noxen Township, Wyoming County in the state of Pennsylvania.  The community is located very close to Pennsylvania Route 29, approximately 10 miles west of Scranton.  As of the 2010 census the population was 633 residents.

Demographics

References

Census-designated places in Wyoming County, Pennsylvania
Census-designated places in Pennsylvania